Yawdanchi (also spelled Yaudanchi) is a dialect of Tule-Kaweah Yokuts that was historically spoken by the Yawdanchi Yokuts people living along the Tule River in the Tulare Lake Basin of California. The Yawdanchi dialect is closely related to the Wiikchamni dialect.

Yawdanchi was documented by A. L. Kroeber who published an article on the grammar and phonology of the dialect in 1907.

References 

Yokutsan languages
Indigenous languages of California